"You're the Reason God Made Oklahoma" is a song from the film Any Which Way You Can, performed by American country music artists David Frizzell and Shelly West. It was written by Larry Collins and Sandy Pinkard (of Pinkard & Bowden). The song was West's debut on the country chart and Frizzell's second hit on the country chart. "You're the Reason God Made Oklahoma", was the most successful of seven country hits by the duo, staying number one on the country chart for one week and 11 weeks in the Top 40 country chart.

Felice and Boudleaux Bryant, the writers of the song "Rocky Top", sued Collins and Pinkard for copyright infringement concerning this song, because the tune was similar to their song "Rocky Top". They won the lawsuit and are now often credited as having co-written the song.

Charts

References

1981 singles
1981 songs
David Frizzell songs
Shelly West songs
Songs written by Felice and Boudleaux Bryant
Song recordings produced by Snuff Garrett
Warner Records singles
Male–female vocal duets
Songs written for films
Songs about Oklahoma